Buck Creek is a stream in the U.S. state of Iowa. It is a tributary to Pechman Creek.

Buck Creek was named in the 19th century after C. H. Buck, a local politician.

References

Rivers of Johnson County, Iowa
Rivers of Washington County, Iowa
Rivers of Iowa